Stephen Murdoch (born 6 August 1983) is a New Zealand cricketer who has played for Wellington and Canterbury.

After playing for Wellington from 2009–10 to 2017–18, in June 2018 Murdoch was awarded a contract with Canterbury for the 2018–19 season. In February 2019, in the 2018–19 Plunket Shield season, Murdoch scored his 5,000th run in the Plunket Shield.

Batting in his usual position at number three, Murdoch hit his highest first-class score of 171 for Wellington against Central Districts in Nelson in 2015–16. He made his highest List A score in 2012-13 when Wellington were chasing Otago's total of 349; going to the wicket at 6 for 1 he made 136 off 124 balls, adding 273 for the second wicket with Michael Papps, and Wellington went on to win with eight balls to spare.

References

External links
 

1983 births
Living people
New Zealand cricketers
Wellington cricketers
Canterbury cricketers
Cricketers from Wellington City